Jennifer George is an American playwright, director, and professor from the Metro Detroit area in Michigan. She is the author of the three act play Mixed.

Early life 
George was born in Granada, Spain, but mainly grew up in the Metro Detroit area in Michigan, and currently lives in Ferndale, Michigan. While George looks European, like her Polish, Irish, and Scottish mother, George began to strongly identify and embrace her Chaldean heritage on her father's side early in life. After growing up in the area, George decided to stay close by to family and attended Wayne State University, where she majored in Theatre Arts. It was while she was working at the Wayne State University bookstore at the time of the Gulf War, that she had an encounter with a woman who stated "I really just hate seeing the Middle Eastern students on campus. I just want to spit on them." This moment inspired George to become more culturally aware, as well as "want to work toward equality"; especially for those who identify with multiple cultural identities like herself.

Career 
After receiving her undergraduate degree, George moved to Paris for a year, where she worked with Euro Disney. After a short stint back in the United States, she moved back to Paris, living there for eight more years. During this time, she received two French degree in Deug and License in theatre from La Sorbonne, University of Paris. At age 30, George moved back to Michigan where she worked as an adjunct theatre professor at her undergraduate alma mater. She then went on to teach French at Marygrove College for seven years.

After being nominated for Best Play and Best Director for her production of Hamlet Machine/Hamlet in 2003 by the Detroit Free Press, George went on to start her own production company where she began to write works under the company name By George, LLC, including her regionally popular play Mixed.

While George continues to write, Mixed is her only written work that has been produced on a larger scale. George currently continues to teach theatre at Oakland Community College and Birmingham Theatre House for mostly children and young adults.

Awards 
2003- Nominated for Best Play and Best Director for Hamlet Machine/Hamlet by the Detroit Free Press

References 

American women dramatists and playwrights
Living people
People from Granada
People from Ferndale, Michigan
Year of birth missing (living people)
21st-century American women writers